Waverley is a civil parish in the Metropolitan Borough of Rotherham in the southeastern part of the county of South Yorkshire, England. The parish was formed on 1 April 2019 from parts of the parishes of Catcliffe and Orgreave. The Advanced Manufacturing Park has been developed in the area of the later parish since the 2000s, partly on land reclaimed from a former opencast coal mine.

Transportation
A railway station is proposed on the Sheffield–Lincoln line which is adjacent to the parish. In 2020, the government announced that it would provide funding for a feasibility study, as part of the Restoring Your Railway scheme.

The bus route 73, operated by First, links Waverley between Rotherham Interchange and Sheffield Interchange.

References 

 Waverley Community Council

Civil parishes in South Yorkshire
Geography of the Metropolitan Borough of Rotherham